Asteliaphasma is a genus of phasmids belonging to the family Diapheromeridae.

The species of this genus are found in New Zealand.

Species:

Asteliaphasma jucundus 
Asteliaphasma naomi

References

Diapheromeridae